The 2004 Karbala and Najaf bombings were car bombings that tore through a funeral procession in Najaf and through the main bus station in nearby Karbala—two Shia holy cities - on 19 December 2004. 66 people were killed and 191 wounded.

Perpetrators 
Abu Musab al-Zarqawi's group Tanzim Qaidat al-Jihad fi Bilad al-Rafidayn ('al-Qaeda in Iraq') said that the group was not responsible for these attacks.

References

2004 murders in Iraq
2004 Najaf bombings
21st-century mass murder in Iraq
Attacks on buildings and structures in Iraq
2004 Najaf bombings
December 2004 crimes
December 2004 events in Iraq
2004 Najaf
Mass murder in 2004
Najaf
Suicide bombings in 2004
Suicide car and truck bombings in Iraq
Terrorist incidents in Iraq in 2004
Violence against Shia Muslims in Iraq